Anne Edwards (born August 20, 1927) is an American writer best known for her biographies of celebrities that include Princess Diana, Maria Callas, Judy Garland, Katharine Hepburn, Vivien Leigh, Margaret Mitchell, Ronald Reagan, Barbra Streisand, Shirley Temple and Countess Sonya Tolstoy.

Life and career
She attended UCLA and SMU. A child performer on stage and radio, she began her writing career as a junior writer at MGM in 1944 and became a noted Hollywood screenwriter and television writer during the late 1940s and early 1950s. She lived in the UK and Europe from the mid-1950s until 1972.

After returning to the United States in 1973, she lived in Massachusetts, New  York and Connecticut before returning to Beverly Hills, California, where she currently resides. Her film credits include co-writing the first draft of the screenplay for the film Funny Girl (1968) starring Barbra Streisand. She wrote her first novel, the best-selling The Survivors, in 1968 and subsequently (as of 2015) has written eight novels, sixteen biographies, three children's books, two memoirs (one with her late husband—composer-musicologist-pianist Stephen Citron) and an autobiography.

She is a past president of the Authors Guild and currently serves on its board of directors. Her collection of literary manuscripts, papers, and related materials is now part of the Special Collections Department of the Charles E. Young Research Library at UCLA, where she has taught writing.

In the mid-1970s, Edwards was hired by the Zanuck-Brown Company to write a story that could be adapted as a film sequel to Gone with the Wind. She produced a meticulously researched novel, which in the end was not used for the sequel and was itself never published. It was through working on this novel that she decided to write her biography of Margaret Mitchell.

In an interview for Publishers Weekly, Edwards said, "An idea hits me, then I develop the story or, in the case of a biography, think of a person who exemplifies that theme. Vivien [Leigh], Judy [Garland] and Sonya [Tolstoy] were vastly interesting people and symbolic of certain things: Judy, the exploitation of a woman; Vivien, somebody who suffered from manic-depression; Sonya, an intelligent woman subjugated to a man who used her, drained her, made a villain of her."

Bibliography

Biographies
 Judy Garland: A Biography (Simon & Schuster, 1975)
 Vivien Leigh: A Biography (Simon & Schuster, 1977)
 Sonya: The Life of Countess Tolstoy (Simon & Schuster, 1981)
 Road to Tara: Life of Margaret Mitchell (Hodder & Stoughton, 1983)
 Matriarch: Queen Mary and the House of Windsor (William Morrow and Company, 1984)
 A Remarkable Woman: A Biography of Katharine Hepburn (Morrow, 1985)
 The DeMilles: An American Family (Harry N. Abrams, 1988)
 Shirley Temple: American Princess (Morrow, 1988)
 Early Reagan: The Rise to Power (Morrow, 1990)
 Royal Sisters: Queen Elizabeth II and Princess Margaret (Morrow, 1990)
 The Grimaldis of Monaco: Centuries of Scandal/Years of Grace (Morrow, 1992)
 Throne of Gold: The Lives of the Aga Khans (Morrow, 1995)
 Streisand: A Biography (Little, Brown, 1997)
 " Diana: The Life She Led " (St. Martin's Press, 1999)  
 Maria Callas: An Intimate Biography (St. Martin's Press, 2001)
 The Reagans: Portrait of a Marriage (St. Martin's Press, 2003)

Novels

 The Survivors (Holt Rinehart Winston, 1968)
 Miklos Alexandrovitch Is Missing (Coward-McCann, 1970)
 Shadow Of A Lion (Coward, McCann & Geoghegan, 1971)
 Haunted Summer (Bantam Books, 1974)
 The Hesitant Heart (Random House, 1974)
 Child of Night (Random House, 1975)
 Wallis: The Novel (Morrow, 1991)
 La Divina (Mandarin Publishing, 1996)

Autobiography

 The Inn and Us (Random House, 1976), co-authored with husband Stephen Citron
 "Scarlett and Me" (The Marietta Gone with the Wind Museum, 2011)
 Leaving Home (Scarecrow Press, 2012)

Children's books

 P. T. Barnum (Putnam, 1977)
 The Great Houdini (Putnam, 1977)
 A Child's Bible'' (Topeka Bindery, 1987), co-authored with Shirley Steen

References

1927 births
American children's writers
20th-century American novelists
American women screenwriters
Novelists from New York (state)
Living people
People from Port Chester, New York
American women children's writers
American women novelists
20th-century American women writers
21st-century American women writers
University of California, Los Angeles alumni
Southern Methodist University alumni
American women television writers
American television writers
20th-century American biographers
21st-century American biographers
American women biographers
Screenwriters from New York (state)
Historians from New York (state)